Kondakovo is the name of several rural localities in Russia:
Kondakovo, Ryazan Oblast, a village in Ryazan Oblast
Kondakovo, Vladimir Oblast, a village in Vladimir Oblast
Kondakovo, Yaroslavl Oblast, a selo in Yaroslavl Oblast